Tortricosia is a genus of moths in the subfamily Arctiinae.

Species
Tortricosia blanda (van Eecke, 1927)
Tortricosia classeyi Holloway, 2001
Tortricosia excisa Hampson, 1900
Tortricosia pallidexcisa Holloway, 2001

References

Natural History Museum Lepidoptera generic names catalog

Cisthenina
Moth genera